Forest Hills is a residential neighborhood in the northwest quadrant of Washington, D.C., United States, bounded by Connecticut Avenue NW to the west, Rock Creek Park to the east, Chevy Chase to the north, and Tilden Street NW to the south. The neighborhood is frequently referred to as Van Ness, both because of its proximity to the University of the District of Columbia (UDC)'s Van Ness campus, and because it is served by the Van Ness–UDC station on the Washington Metro's Red Line.

Transportation 
In addition to its location adjacent to Connecticut Avenue, Forest Hills is served by the Red Line of the Washington Metro, and the Crosstown Line (H2, H3, and H4) and Connecticut Avenue Line (L1, L2, and L4) of the D.C. Metrobus.

Points of interest 

Forest Hills contains the former site of the Civil War-era Fort Kearny, of which no trace remains today, and the Soapstone Valley Park, which surrounds a tributary of Rock Creek.

The Howard University School of Law campus is across Connecticut Avenue from UDC on Upton Street NW. The Levine School of Music is located on Upton Street, in the building originally occupied by the Carnegie Geophysical Laboratory. The Edmund Burke School, founded in 1968, is located on Upton Street, in the building that was originally occupied by Devitt Prep.

The Hillwood Museum, located in a house that once belonged to philanthropist and socialite Marjorie Merriweather Post, contains her collection of decorative objects, including several Fabergé eggs.

The embassies of the Czech Republic and the Netherlands are located on Linnean Avenue NW in Forest Hills, while that of Suriname is on Connecticut Avenue. The embassy of Hungary is just south of Tilden Street in Cleveland Park, and a number of other embassies are located just to the west in North Cleveland Park.

The Seventh-day Adventist Capital Memorial Church is located in 3150 Chesapeake Street NW.

History
The National Bureau of Standards (now the National Institute of Standards and Technology) was at one time the largest employer in the neighborhood.

Due to an absence of restricted housing covenants as in other, similarly situated neighborhoods, the Forest Hills neighborhood became predominantly Jewish during the 1940s and 1950s.

References

External links 

 ANC 3F, Forest Hills Advisory Neighborhood Commission
 Forest Hills Metro Station Info from Washington Metropolitan Area Transit Authority 

 
Historic Jewish communities in the United States
Jews and Judaism in Washington, D.C.
Neighborhoods in Northwest (Washington, D.C.)